The 1987–88 season was Mansfield Town's 51st season in the Football League and 17th in the Third Division they finished in 19th position with 54 points.

Final league table

Results

Football League Third Division

FA Cup

League Cup

League Trophy

Squad statistics
 Squad list sourced from

References
General
 Mansfield Town 1987–88 at soccerbase.com (use drop down list to select relevant season)

Specific

Mansfield Town F.C. seasons
Mansfield Town